Juan Pierre Jonck (born 7 December 1991) is a South African professional rugby union player who most recently played with Currie Cup side the . His regular position is flanker.

Career

Youth / Poneke / Wellington

Jonck attended Hoërskool Roodepoort, where he not only played rugby for the first team, but also took part in Greco-Roman wrestling.

However, he then moved to Wellington, New Zealand, where he joined Swindale Shield side Poneke. He represented the Poneke Colts team in 2011 and appeared for their first team in 2012. He was also a member of the ITM Cup side 's Under-20 and Under-21s teams.

Wits / Falcons

Jonck returned to South Africa in 2013 to play rugby for the University of the Witwatersrand.

Jonck started six of their seven matches in the 2014 Varsity Cup – scoring a try in their 15–32 defeat to Johannesburg rivals  – but his side lost all their matches in the competition for the season year in a row to be relegated back to the Varsity Shield for the 2015 season.

However, Jonck joined Kempton Park-based side  for their 2014 Currie Cup qualification campaign. The Falcons finished in sixth position on the log, resulting in them playing in the 2014 Currie Cup First Division. He started their semi-final as the Falcons caused an upset by beating a Leopards side that finished top of the log 31–24 in a match in Potchefstroom. He also started the final, but ended on the losing side, as a 23–21 victory by the  saw them win the title for the first time in six years.

College Rovers / NMMU / Kings

In 2015, Jonck was named in the College Rovers squad that participated at the 2015 SARU Community Cup. However, he failed to make any appearances for the KwaZulu-Natal club side in this nationwide competition.

References

South African rugby union players
Living people
1991 births
People from Roodepoort
Rugby union flankers
Falcons (rugby union) players
Southern Kings players
Rugby union players from Gauteng